Eubha Akilade (born 27 June 1998) is a Scottish actress and dancer, known for her roles as Lily Watson on the CBBC series Eve (2015–2017) and Ines Le Breton on the Hulu series Find Me in Paris (2018–2020).

Early life
Akilade was born on 27 June 1998 in Cathcart, Scotland. She is of Nigerian descent, was born to mother Christine, a Macmillan Cancer Support nurse, and she has a brother and a sister. Akilade began attending the Dance School of Scotland in Knightswood, but quit when she secured her role in Eve.

Career
Akilade made her professional debut as Lily Watson in the CBBC children's series Eve in 2015, a role she portrayed until 2017, despite having no formal training. Then in 2017, she appeared in two episodes of the BBC Three series Clique as a receptionist. Later that year, she was cast as Ines Lebreton in the Hulu series Find Me in Paris, a role she portrayed until 2020. On her casting, Akilade commented: "Within two weeks of the audition, I found out that I’d got the part and that I was flying to Paris for the next six months two weeks later". Then in May 2020, she appeared in an episode of the BBC soap opera Doctors as Sophie Broomfield.

Filmography

References

External links
 

1998 births
21st-century Scottish actresses
Actresses from Glasgow
Living people
People from Cathcart
Scottish ballerinas
Scottish child actresses
Scottish people of Nigerian descent
Scottish soap opera actresses
Scottish television actresses